The Womersley Baronetcy, of Grimsby in the County of Lincoln, is a title in the Baronetage of the United Kingdom. It was created on 3 September 1945 for the Conservative politician and former Minister of Pensions, Walter Womersley. As of 2010 the title is held by his grandson, the second Baronet, who succeeded in 1961.

Womersley baronets, of Grimsby (1945)
Sir Walter James Womersley, 1st Baronet (1878–1961)
Sir Peter John Walter Womersley, 2nd Baronet (born 1941)

References
Kidd, Charles, Williamson, David (editors). Debrett's Peerage and Baronetage (1990 edition). New York: St Martin's Press, 1990.

Baronetcies in the Baronetage of the United Kingdom